From the time of Plato through the Middle Ages, the quadrivium (plural: quadrivia) was a grouping of four subjects or arts—arithmetic, geometry, music, and astronomy—that formed a second curricular stage following preparatory work in the trivium, consisting of grammar, logic, and rhetoric. Together, the  trivium and the quadrivium comprised the seven liberal arts, and formed the basis of a liberal arts education in Western society until gradually displaced as a curricular structure by the studia humanitatis and its later offshoots, beginning with Petrarch in the 14th century. The seven classical arts were considered "thinking skills" and were distinguished from practical arts, such as medicine and architecture. 

The quadrivium, Latin for 'four ways', and its use for the four subjects have been attributed to Boethius, who likely coined the term. It was considered the foundation for the study of philosophy (sometimes called the "liberal art par excellence") and theology. The quadrivium was the upper division of the medieval education in the liberal arts, which comprised arithmetic (number in the abstract), geometry (number in space), music (number in time), and astronomy (number in space and time). 

Educationally, the trivium and the quadrivium imparted to the student the seven essential thinking skills of classical antiquity. Altogether the Seven Liberal Arts belonged to the so-called 'Low Faculty' (of Arts), whereas Medicine, Jurisprudence (Law), and Theology were established in the three so-called 'High' faculties. Thereby it was quite common in the middle ages that the lecturers in the Low Faculty (for trivium and/or quadrivium) to be students themselves in one of the High faculties. Philosophy was typically not a subject (nor faculty) in its own right, but was rather present implicitly as an 'auxiliary tool' within the discourses of the High faculties (especially theology); the complete emancipation of philosophy from theology happened only after the Medieval era.

Displacement of the quadrivium by other curricular approaches from the time of Petrarch gained momentum with the subsequent Renaissance emphasis on what became the modern humanities, one of four liberal arts of the modern era, alongside natural science (where much of the actual subject matter of the original quadrivium now resides), social science, and the arts; though it may appear that music in the quadrivium would be a modern branch of performing arts, it was then an abstract system of proportions that was carefully studied at a distance from actual musical practice, and effectively a branch of music theory more tightly bound to arithmetic than to musical expression.

Origins

These four studies compose the secondary part of the curriculum outlined by Plato in The Republic and are described in the seventh book of that work (in the order Arithmetic, Geometry, Astronomy, Music).
The quadrivium is implicit in early Pythagorean writings and in the De nuptiis of Martianus Capella, although the term quadrivium was not used until Boethius, early in the sixth century.  As Proclus wrote:

The Pythagoreans considered all mathematical science to be divided into four parts: one half they marked off as concerned with quantity, the other half with magnitude; and each of these they posited as twofold. A quantity can be considered in regard to its character by itself or in its relation to another quantity, magnitudes as either stationary or in motion. Arithmetic studies quantities as such, music the relations between quantities, geometry magnitude at rest, spherics [astronomy] magnitude inherently moving.

Medieval usage

At many medieval universities, this would have been the course leading to the degree of Master of Arts (after the BA). After the MA, the student could enter for bachelor's degrees of the higher faculties (Theology, Medicine or Law). To this day, some of the postgraduate degree courses lead to the degree of Bachelor (the B.Phil and B.Litt. degrees are examples in the field of philosophy).

The study was eclectic, approaching the philosophical objectives sought by considering it from each aspect of the quadrivium within the general structure demonstrated by Proclus (AD 412–485), namely arithmetic and music on the one hand and geometry and cosmology on the other.

The subject of music within the quadrivium was originally the classical subject of harmonics, in particular the study of the proportions between the musical intervals created by the division of a monochord. A relationship to music as actually practised was not part of this study, but the framework of classical harmonics would substantially influence the content and structure of music theory as practised in both European and Islamic cultures.

Modern usage
In modern applications of the liberal arts as curriculum in colleges or universities, the quadrivium may be considered to be the study of number and its relationship to space or time: arithmetic was pure number, geometry was number in space, music was number in time, and astronomy was number in space and time. Morris Kline classified the four elements of the quadrivium as pure (arithmetic), stationary (geometry), moving (astronomy), and applied (music) number.

This schema is sometimes referred to as "classical education", but it is more accurately a development of the 12th- and 13th-century Renaissance with recovered classical elements, rather than an organic growth from the educational systems of antiquity. The term continues to be used by the classical education movement and at the independent Oundle School, in the United Kingdom.

See also

 Andreas Capellanus
 Degrees of the University of Oxford
 Four arts
 Golden Ratio
 Martianus Capella
 Trivium

References

Book sources 

 

4 Quadrivium
Liberal arts education
Medieval European education

es:Artes liberales#Las siete artes: Trivium et Quadrivium